Samuel J. Wilson (30 November 1936 – 30 October 2022) was a Northern Irish footballer who played as a forward.

Career
Born in Dromore, County Down on 30 November 1936, Wilson played for Crusaders, Glenavon, Falkirk, Dundee and Coleraine. He also earned twelve caps for the Northern Ireland national team.

Wilson later became a farmer, auctioneer and estate agent.

References

1936 births
2022 deaths
Association footballers from Northern Ireland
Association football forwards
Northern Ireland international footballers
NIFL Premiership players
Scottish Football League players
Crusaders F.C. players
Glenavon F.C. players
Falkirk F.C. players
Dundee F.C. players
Coleraine F.C. players
Expatriate association footballers from Northern Ireland
Expatriate footballers in Scotland